Limbo Carnival is an album by American jazz vibraphonist Dave Pike which was recorded in 1962 for the New Jazz label.

Reception

AllMusic awarded the album 4 stars stating "Three months after recording the excellent Bossa Nova Carnival, Dave Pike returned to the studio in December 1962 and recorded another fine LP that underscored his interest in world music. But instead of providing another Brazilian-oriented album, the vibist/marimba player opted to explore Caribbean rhythms and melodies".

Track listing
 "La Bamba" (Ritchie Valens) - 7:36
 "My Little Suede Shoes" (Charlie Parker) - 3:55
 "Matilda" (Norman Span) - 3:50
 "Mambo Bounce" (Sonny Rollins) - 3:10
 "Limbo Rock" (Jon Sheldon, Billy Strange) - 2:28
 "Calypso Blues" (Nat King Cole, Don George) - 3:45
 "Catin' Latin'" (Pony Poindexter) - 4:45
 "St. Thomas" (Rollins) - 3:45
 "Jamaica Farewell" (Lord Burgess) - 5:00

Personnel 
Dave Pike - vibraphone, marimba
Leo Wright - alto saxophone, flute (tracks 1, 3, 5 & 9)
Jimmy Raney - guitar (tracks 1, 3, 5 & 9)
Tommy Flanagan - piano (tracks 2, 4 & 6-8)
Ahmed Abdul-Malik (tracks 2, 4 & 6-8), George Duvivier (tracks 1, 3, 5 & 9) - bass
Willie Bobo - drums
Ray Barretto - congas

References 

1963 albums
Dave Pike albums
New Jazz Records albums
Albums recorded at Van Gelder Studio
Albums produced by Elliot Mazer